Frederick Allen (July 1860 – c. 1926) was an English professional footballer who played in the Football Alliance for Small Heath.

Allen was born in the Hockley district of Birmingham and played football for Springhill Methodists before joining Small Heath in 1890. He played three times for them in the Football Alliance in the 1891–92 season when Jack Hallam was switched to a more central forward position. He died in Birmingham in about 1926.

A forward called Fred Allen is recorded to have played for Luton Town in the Southern League from 1892 to 1895. He was the club's top goalscorer during the 1893–94 season.

References

1860 births
1926 deaths
Footballers from Birmingham, West Midlands
English footballers
Association football wingers
Birmingham City F.C. players
Luton Town F.C. players
Southern Football League players
Date of death missing
Football Alliance players